NA-198 Ghotki-I is a constituency for the National Assembly of Pakistan.

Election 2002 

General elections were held on 10 Oct 2002. Khalid Ahmed Khan Lund  of PPP won by 68,296 votes.

Election 2008 

General elections were held on 18 Feb 2008. Mian Abdul Haq Alias Mian Mitho of PPP won by 59,022 votes.

Election 2013 

General elections were held on 11 May 2013. Ali Gohar Khan Mahar of PPP won by 86,579 votes and became the  member of National Assembly.

Election 2018 

General elections are scheduled to be held on 25 July 2018.

See also
NA-197 Qambar Shahdadkot-II
NA-199 Ghotki-II

References

External links 
Election result's official website

NA-200